Nurgaram District is a district of Nuristan Province in Afghanistan. It was established in the 2004 Afghanistan administrative reorganization out of parts of Nuristan District and Wama District.

Notes

External links
 Map of Natural Hazards & Settlements iMMap

Districts of Nuristan Province